Dears is a Taiwanese duo formed in 2014 by Alfa Music. The duo consists of Dewi Chien and Dabe Chen. They released their first EP, Dears on August 16, 2014. On January 22, 2016, Dears released their second EP, Say Yes.

References

External links

Taiwanese girl groups
Taiwanese musical duos
Mandopop musical groups
Pop music duos
Musical groups established in 2014
2014 establishments in Taiwan